Memory Game (sometimes referred to as Joe Garagiola's Memory Game) was an American television game show that aired on NBC. The series – hosted by Joe Garagiola – ran from February 15 to July 30, 1971. The show's creator and packager was Merv Griffin, and its announcer was Johnny Olson (his only announcing job for Merv Griffin Productions).

Gameplay
Five contestants, all women and one of them a returning champion (or designate), competed and were spotted $50 at the start of the game. Before each round, they were each given a booklet containing the questions and answers to be used in that round. The time they had to study the material varied per round. Once the study time period elapsed, the show's assistants collected the booklets and Garagiola began asking questions at random from the booklet.
	 
The champion – who was seated in the number 1 position – could elect to answer or call out an opponent's number (2 through 5). That player could answer or call any of her opponents to answer, and so on until a "time's up" buzzer sounded. At that time, the active player at that moment had to answer. A correct answer was worth $5, a wrong answer lost that amount. Play continued in this fashion until all the questions were exhausted.
	 
Subsequent rounds were played with increased stakes ($10 in Round 2, $20 in Round 3 and all future rounds). The winner at the end of the show won a $1,000 bonus and returned the next day to meet new challengers. If a contestant stayed on for three days, she retired undefeated and won a new car.

Broadcast history
Memory Game was one of eight shows NBC attempted to program in the 1:30 PM (12:30 Central) time slot between 1968 and 1975; like most of the others, CBS' As the World Turns and ABC's Let's Make a Deal (formerly seen on NBC) soundly defeated it in the ratings.

Three weeks after this show's cancellation, NBC moved Garagiola to another daytime game, Sale of the Century, which he hosted for the rest of its original run. Three on a Match, hosted by Bill Cullen, replaced Memory Game on the NBC schedule.

Production
According to The Encyclopedia of Daytime Television by Wesley Hyatt, Griffin did not identify his production company on the end credits of the program. The talk-show host and entertainment mogul never gave any explanation for his decision.

Episode status
Much like other NBC games of the era, most episodes of Memory Game are believed to have been wiped as per network practices. Five episodes are known to exist at the UCLA Film and Television Archive.  Audio of the premiere episode from February 15, 1971, was posted to You Tube in December 2022.

References

External links
 Memory Game entry at Internet Movie Database.

NBC original programming
1970s American game shows
1971 American television series debuts
1971 American television series endings
Television series by Merv Griffin Enterprises
Television series by Sony Pictures Television
Television series created by Merv Griffin
Memory games